Hospice is the third studio album by American indie rock band The Antlers, and their first concept album. It was initially self-distributed by the band in March 2009, and was eventually remastered and re-released once they signed to Frenchkiss Records in August of the same year.

Concept
Set in New York City's Memorial Sloan Kettering Cancer Center, which the second track is named after, Hospice tells the story of a relationship between a hospice worker and a female patient suffering from terminal bone cancer, their ensuing romance, and their slow downward spiral as a result of the woman's traumas, fears, and disease. The story of her deterioration also serves as a metaphor for an abusive relationship. Frontman Peter Silberman has been reluctant to divulge explicit details regarding the meaning of the record, and the extent to which it is autobiographical.

Release
The first single was "Bear", released in April 2009 to promote the self-released version of Hospice. "Two" was the first single released commercially, as a digital download in June 2009. The song's music video features a combination of photography and cutout animation, and was directed by Ethan Segal and Albert Thrower. In the United Kingdom, "Bear" was released on 7-inch vinyl on November 16, 2009, featuring an exclusive remix of "Bear" by Darby Cicci on the B-side. Additionally, an exclusive live recording of "Sylvia" at The Orchard in New York City was released as a download on November 17, 2009. "Sylvia" was issued as the third proper single on March 22, 2010. A music video was produced for the song, directed by Trey Hock, and premiered on the IFC's website on April 15, 2010.

Reissue and 10th anniversary tour
On March 8, 2019, The Antlers reissued Hospice via Frenchkiss/Transgressive. The reissue was pressed on double white vinyl and featured updated artwork and packaging from artist Zan Goodman. The same year, The Antlers embarked on a 10th anniversary tour, playing the album in its entirety. However, Silberman's health concerns led them to perform acoustic versions of the songs during intimate shows in smaller venues. It was the band's first live performances since 2015. The tour officially marked the departure of multi-instrumentalist Darby Cicci.

Reception

The album was released to critical acclaim. Pitchfork endorsed the re-release of Hospice with their "Best New Music" stamp. NPR Music placed the album at number one on their list of the top ten albums of early 2009. At the end of the year, Pitchfork placed it number 37 on their list of the best albums of 2009, praising its "power to emotionally destroy listeners." Beats Per Minute named it the best album of 2009, while Rhapsody deemed it the 24th best album of 2009.

It sold 13,000 copies in the United States by October 9, according to Nielsen SoundScan.

Track listing
All songs written by Peter Silberman. In the liner notes, all songs are given alternate titles.

Release history

Credits

Personnel
 Peter Silberman – vocals, guitar, accordion, harmonica, harp, keyboards
 Darby Cicci – trumpet, bowed banjo
 Michael Lerner – drums, percussion
 Justin Stivers – bass
 Sharon Van Etten – vocals on "Kettering," "Thirteen," "Two," and "Shiva"

Production
 Recorded at Watcher's Woods, Brooklyn
 Mastered by Greg Calbi at Sterling Sound
 Original release mastered by Timothy Stollenwerk
 Artwork by Zan Goodman
 Design by Darby Cicci

References

2009 albums
The Antlers (band) albums
Frenchkiss Records albums
Concept albums
Works about cancer